Bernhard Brink (born 17 May 1952 in Nordhorn) is a German Schlager singer, TV and radio presenter.

Life 
After school Brink studied German law in Berlin, but didn't finish university studies. Brink is a German singer of Schlager songs. Since the 1970s he is famous for his songs in Germany.

Awards 
 1993: Goldene Stimmgabel

References

External links 
 

German male singers
Schlager musicians
1952 births
Living people